The Clarinet Quartet, also known as Quartet for Clarinet and String Trio, is a work for clarinet, violin, viola, and cello by Polish composer Krzysztof Penderecki. It was finished in 1993.

Composition and premiere 

This composition was dedicated to Ake Holmquist and premiered in Lübeck on August 13, 1993. For this performance, Israeli clarinetist Sharon Kam, German violinist Christoph Poppen, American violist Kim Kashkashian, and collaborator and Russian cellist Boris Piergamienszczikow played the work under the baton of Penderecki himself. These musicians also performed the piece to be broadcast in television, also with Penderecki as conductor. It was later published by Schott Music.

Harry Kinross-White also wrote an arrangement of this composition for saxophone quartet in 1999. The first performance of this arrangement took place in the Dresden Days of Contemporary Music in 1999 by Raschèr Saxophone Quartet.

Analysis 

The Clarinet Quartet takes approximately 15 minutes to perform and is in four movements. The movement list is as follows:

 Notturno. Adagio
 Scherzo. Vivacissimo
 Serenade. Tempo di Valse
 Abschied. Larghetto

Reception 

This composition received universal acclaim, both in the first performance and in recordings. In the premiere, the composition was played twice due to audience demand. According to Lutz Lesle, the composition was inspired by Schubert's String Quintet.

Notable recordings 

Following are some of the most well-known recordings of this piece:

The saxophone quartet version has also been recorded by Raschèr Saxophone Quartet and released by BIS Records in 2001.

References

External links 

 A preview of the score is available here
 The video version of this composition in IMDb

Compositions for clarinet
Compositions by Krzysztof Penderecki
1993 compositions